Governor Worthington may refer to:

Thomas Worthington (governor), 6th Governor of Ohio
William Grafton Delaney Worthington, Governor of the Territory of East Florida from 1821 to 1823